WABA Multipower for season 2008–09 was the eighth season of WABA League. The league included nine teams from five countries, with Šibenik Jolly becoming champions, for the fourth time in the team's history. In this season participating clubs from Serbia, Montenegro, Bosnia and Herzegovina, Croatia and from Slovenia.

The season began on 11 October 2008 and ended on 28 February 2009, when it completed a Regular season. The Final Four was played during the 14th and 15 March 2009 in Bijelo Polje, Montenegro. The Winner of the Final Four this season was Šibenik Jolly from Croatia.

Team information

Regular season 
The season was played with 9 teams in a dual circuit system, each team playing one game at home and one away. The four best teams at the end of the regular season were placed in the Final Four. The regular season began on 11 October 2008 and it ended on 28 February 2009.

Final four 
The final four was played from 14–15 March 2009, in the Nikoljac hall in Bijelo Polje, Montenegro.

Awards 
 Player of the Year: Constance Jinks (170-G-81) of Šibenik Jolly 
 Coach of the Year: Anđelko Matov of Šibenik Jolly 

1st Team
 Constance Jinks (170-G-81) of Šibenik Jolly 
 Marija Vrsaljko (195-C-89) of Gospić Croatia Osiguranje 
 Luca Ivanković (200-C-87) of Šibenik Jolly 
 Jasmina Bigović (174-G-79) of Jedinstvo 
 Monique Blake (188-F-85) of Merkur Celje 

2nd Team
 Ivana Jurčević (174-G-81) of Šibenik Jolly 
 Jelena Ivezić (184-G-84) of Gospić Croatia Osiguranje 
 Carla Thomas (191-F/C-85) of Gospić Croatia Osiguranje 
 Mirna Mazić (188-F-85) of Medveščak 
 Lady Comfort (188-C-86) of Budućnost 

Honorable Mention
 Neda Lokas (182-F-85) of Šibenik Jolly 
 Marta Čakić (175-G-82) of Šibenik Jolly 
 Lamisha Augustine (186-F-82) of Gospić Croatia Osiguranje 
 Dea Klein-Šumanovac (182-G/F-81) of Medveščak 
 Sanja Knežević (187-F-84) of Jedinstvo 
 Nika Barič (168-G-92) of Merkur Celje 
 Dragoslava Žakula (173-G-73) of Mladi Krajišnik 
 Matea Vrdoljak (186-F-85) of Ragusa Dubrovnik 
 Anja Stupar (178-F/C-89) of Vojvodina NIS

External links 
 2008–09 WABA Multipower at eurobasket.com

2008-09
2008–09 in European women's basketball leagues
2008–09 in Serbian basketball
2008–09 in Bosnia and Herzegovina basketball
2008–09 in Slovenian basketball
2008–09 in Montenegrin basketball
2008–09 in Croatian basketball